Harold Turner (30 January 1911 – 1 June 1984) was an  Australian rules footballer who played with Hawthorn in the Victorian Football League (VFL).

Notes

External links 

1911 births
1984 deaths
Australian rules footballers from Victoria (Australia)
Hawthorn Football Club players